Ambur is a town and municipality in newly announced Tirupattur District, Tamil Nadu, India. It is located on the banks of the Palar River between Chennai and Bangalore. Ambur has a sizeable leather industry, and is known for its spicy biryani and for the sweet, makkhenpeda. Ambur was the site of two major military actions in the 18th century. The first was the 1749 Battle of Ambur that opened the Second Carnatic War between the Arcot State and the Mughal Empire. In 1767, the siege of Ambur took place during the First Anglo-Mysore War, with local troops and a British force successfully resisting an attack by the Kingdom of Mysore and by the Hyderabad State.

Administration
Ambur is a selection grade municipality and headquarters of Ambur taluk which is an administrative division comprising 79 Revenue villages in the district of Tirupattur. The municipal council has 36 elected members. It elects a member for representing the Ambur assembly constituency.

Demographics

According to 2011 census, Ambur had a population of 114,608 with a sex-ratio of 1,033 females for every 1,000 males, much above the national average of 929. A total of 13,235 were under the age of six, constituting 6,716 males and 6,519 females. Scheduled Castes and Scheduled Tribes accounted for 16.83% and 0.57% of the population respectively. The average literacy of the city was 76.08%, compared to the national average of 72.99%. The city had a total of 25,009 households. There were a total of 40,654 workers, comprising 163 cultivators, 519 main agricultural labourers, 982 in house hold industries, 35,411 other workers, 3,579 marginal workers, 27 marginal cultivators, 174 marginal agricultural labourers, 306 marginal workers in household industries and 3,072 other marginal workers.

As per the religious census of 2011, Muslims were majority in Ambur with 50.1%. 45.8% were Hindus, 3.8% Christians and 0.3% followed other religions.

Deccani Urdu is the most spoken language by 48.27% of the population. Tamil and Telugu are the other main languages spoken by 44.36% and 6.17% respectively.

Geography
It lies roughly halfway between Chennai (190 km away) and Bengaluru (161 km away). Ambur has a tropical wet-and-dry climate, reaching high temperatures during summer and experiences wet winters. The maximum rainfall occurs during October and November, with the northeast monsoon. The area also experiences light rainfall during the southwest monsoon. The temperature falls up to 12 °C low in winter. It experience a hot summer where the temperature rises up to 39 °C.

Economy
The economy is dependent on the leather industry. The town houses leather tanning and manufacturing facilities and is a leading cluster for export of finished leather and leather-related products. In the beginning, the development of tanning in Ambur was due to military demand for tanned leather primarily for boot production during and before World War I. Nearly 80 tanneries are located in Ambur

Cuisine
Rice is the staple food of the people in this region. Ambur is known for its spicy biryani.

Transport
Ambur has a regular railway station (code name: AB) with double electric-line track. 24 trains stop at this station. Ambur bus stand was constructed in 1988. Ambur is located in between Bangalore, and Chennai, and connected well with frequent bus and train services.

References

Cities and towns in Tirupathur district